"She's Back" is a song released by the South Korean boy band Infinite. The song is the second single from their debut mini album First Invasion and it was released as a digital single on August 4, 2010. The song was later re-recorded in Japanese and will be used as the group's third Japanese single, released on August 29, 2012.

Composition
The song was written by Song Soo Yun, Han Jaeho, Kim Seungsoo (also known as Sweetune) and Mithra Jin from Epik High. It was produced by Kim Seungsoo. Sweetune is also known for producing the songs "BTD (Before the Dawn)", "Be Mine" and "Paradise" of the group.

Promotions
The group started promoting the track on August 5, 2010, on Mnet's M! Countdown, following the promotions of their debut single "Come Back Again". The song was also promoted on the shows Music Bank, Show! Music Core and Inkigayo. The promotions of the song and of the EP First Invasion ended on September 11, on MBC's Music Core.

Music video
A teaser of the music video was released on August 1, 2010. The music video was released on August 4, 2010, along with the digital release of the single. The music video feature the group playing on a beach and on a swimming pool. It also features scenes of the group singing the song together.

Track listing
Korean digital single
She's Back - 3:15
She's Back (Remix) - 3:11

Japanese Tsutaya rental single
She's Back - 3:15
She's Back (Music video)

Chart performance
The song debuted at the number 80 in Gaon's singles chart on the week of August 8 and climbed to the position 66 on the following week, making the peak of the song. On the following week the song dropped to number 95. The song was more successful than the previous single "Come Back Again".

Charts

Japanese version

Two years later after its original release, it was announced that the song was re-recorded in Japanese and was used as their third single in Japan. It was released on August 29, 2012, in 2 editions: CD+DVD limited and Regular edition.

Composition
All songs from the single were previously released in Korean on the group's debut EP First Invasion. The remix of the song "She's Back" was previously released on the digital single of the Korean version of the song. The B-side "TO-RA-WA" is a Japanese version of the song "Come Back Again".

Music video
A preview of the music video was released on July 20, 2012. The full music video was released on July 26, 2012, on Woollim Entertainment's YouTube account. The Japanese version of the music video follows the same concept of the Korean music video.

Track listing

Charts

Oricon

Release history

References

2010 singles
2012 singles
Korean-language songs
Japanese-language songs
South Korean songs
2010 songs
Infinite (group) songs